Ophichthus tetratrema is an eel in the family Ophichthidae (worm/snake eels). It was described by John E. McCosker and Richard Heinrich Rosenblatt in 1998. It is a marine, deep water-dwelling eel which is known from the eastern Pacific Ocean, including Costa Rica and Ecuador.

The species epithet "tetratrema" means "four holed" in Greek, and is treated as a noun in apposition. It refers to the four preopercular pores on the eel.

References

Taxa named by John E. McCosker
Taxa named by Richard Heinrich Rosenblatt
Fish described in 1998
tetratrema
Fish of the Pacific Ocean